The 1936 Akron Zippers football team was an American football team that represented the University of Akron as an independent during the 1936 college football season. In its first season under head coach Jim Aiken, the team compiled a 6–2–1 record and outscored opponents by a total of 150 to 87. Mike Krino, Bob Bauer, and Ernie Kaufman were the team captains.

Schedule

References

Akron
Akron Zips football seasons
Akron Zippers football